Henry Bingham may refer to:

Sir Henry Bingham, 1st Baronet (1573–c. 1658), Irish MP for Castlebar
Sir Henry Bingham, 3rd Baronet (1654–1714), Irish MP for Mayo, Custos Rotulorum for Mayo
Henry H. Bingham (1841–1912), US Brigadier General, Medal of Honor recipient